Jeff Gray may refer to: 

 Jeff Gray (baseball, born 1963), former Major League Baseball pitcher for Cincinnati and Boston
 Jeff Gray (baseball, born 1981), former Major League Baseball pitcher for Oakland, Chicago (NL), Chicago (AL), Seattle, and Minnesota
 Jeffrey Alan Gray (1934–2004), British psychologist

See also 
 Geoff Gray (born 1994), Canadian gridiron football player
 Geoff Gray (cricketer) (born 1943), Australian cricket player
 Geoffrey Gray (born 1979), American author, documentary producer, and journalist
 Geoffrey Gray (basketball) (born 1997), American-Israeli professional basketball player
 Geoffrey Grey (born 1934), British composer
 Jeffrey Grey (1959–2016), Australian military historian